Dean Lane railway station opened on 17 May 1880 and served Newton Heath, Manchester, England.

The station closed for conversion to Metrolink on 3 October 2009 and re-opened as Newton Heath and Moston Metrolink on 13 June 2012, using only the former Manchester-bound platform. The track has been singled through the station, allowing Network Rail to use the other line to access the Greater Manchester Waste Disposal facility.

Old line 
The Oldham loop line, closed 3 October 2009. Stations, anticlockwise from Manchester:
 Dean Lane
 Failsworth
 Hollinwood
 Oldham Werneth
 Oldham Mumps
 Derker
 Shaw and Crompton
 New Hey
 Milnrow

References

Bibliography
 Butt, R.V.J  "The Directory of Railway Stations", Patrick Stephens, Sparkford, 1995, 

Disused railway stations in Manchester
Former Lancashire and Yorkshire Railway stations
Railway stations in Great Britain opened in 1880
Railway stations in Great Britain closed in 2009
DfT Category F2 stations